Fausto José Tomás Lúcio (born 12 January 1985) is a Portuguese footballer who plays as a defensive midfielder for Louletano.

Club career
He started his career with Portuguese Second Division team Louletano. He made 74 appearances and one goal for the Portuguese club before joining Ayia Napa. He signed for Al Shorta SC in Iraq in 2014 but was released almost immediately as coach Mohamed Youssef was not impressed with his performance in training.

External links
 
 

1985 births
Living people
Portuguese footballers
Association football defenders
Cypriot First Division players
Louletano D.C. players
Portimonense S.C. players
Ayia Napa FC players
S.C. Farense players
Portuguese expatriate footballers
Expatriate footballers in Cyprus
Portuguese expatriate sportspeople in Cyprus
People from Loulé
Al-Shorta SC players
Sportspeople from Faro District